Dendrobium cancroides, commonly known as the crab orchid, is an epiphytic or lithophytic orchid in the family Orchidaceae. It has long, narrow, flattened stems with up to fourteen leaves in the upper half and one or two star-shaped reddish brown flowers with a yellow centre. It grows in rainforest, often in trees overhanging streams in tropical North Queensland.

Description 
The flowers are reddish brown with a yellow centre and do not open widely. The lobes are triangular, the middle lobe with a white ridge near its base and long white hairs on its edge. Flowering occurs from December to May.

Taxonomy and naming
Dendrobium cancroides was first formally described in 1947 by Trevor Edgar Hunt and the description was published in the journal the North Queensland Naturalist from a specimen collected on the Mount Bellenden Ker range. The specific epithet (cancroides) is derived from the Latin word cancer meaning "crab" and the suffix -oides meaning "like", "resembling" or "having the form of".

Distribution and habitat
The crab orchid usually grows on trees in rainforest, often on branches overhanging watercourses. It occurs between the McIlwraith Range and the Johnstone River in Far North Queensland.

References

cancroides
Orchids of Queensland
Plants described in 1873